Matthew Jacob Grimes (born 15 July 1995) is an English professional footballer who plays as a midfielder for Welsh club Swansea City.

He began his career at Exeter City, where he made his professional debut in League Two in August 2013. In January 2015, he was signed by Premier League club Swansea for an undisclosed fee believed to be around £1.75 million. Grimes has also represented England at under-20 and under-21 level.

Club career

Exeter City
Born in Exeter, Devon, Grimes came through his hometown club Exeter City's academy and was given a professional contract by the club in April 2013. He made his League Two debut on 17 August 2013 in a 2–0 victory over AFC Wimbledon at St James Park. In February 2014, Exeter City manager Paul Tisdale described Grimes as the best young player he had seen in his 8 years at the club praising his technical ability and reading of the game. On 18 April, away at Chesterfield's Proact Stadium, he scored his first professional goal for relegation-threatened Exeter, a deflected free kick in the 18th minute to open a 1–1 draw against the highly ranked opponents. Grimes won Exeter's player of the season award at the end of the 2013–14 season and that summer committed his immediate future to the club despite reported interest from various Premier League sides.

Despite leaving the division halfway through the season when he signed for Swansea, Grimes was chosen in League Two's PFA Team of the Year for the 2014–15 season.

Swansea City
On 2 January 2015, Grimes signed for Premier League side Swansea City with Exeter City receiving an undisclosed club record fee, believed to be in the region of £1.75 million. He completed 90 minutes for the Swansea under-21 side in a 2–1 win against Queens Park Rangers on 27 January. On 1 February, Grimes was called up a Swansea matchday squad for the first time, remaining an unused substitute as they won 1–0 away to Southampton. His debut for the team came on 4 April, as a 90th-minute substitute for Jonjo Shelvey in a 3–1 win over Hull City at the Liberty Stadium. He scored his first goal for the club against York City in a 3–0 home win in the League Cup second round on 25 August 2015.

Blackburn Rovers (loan)
On 13 February 2016, Grimes joined Championship club Blackburn Rovers on a loan deal lasting until the end of the season, making 12 appearances.

Leeds United loan spell (2016–17)
On 6 July, Grimes returned to the Championship, joining Leeds United on a season-long loan, signed by his former Swansea manager Garry Monk and assistant Pep Clotet. On 5 August, Grimes was given the squad number 16 shirt for the 2016–17 season. On 7 August, Grimes made his Leeds debut against Q.P.R. in a 3–0 defeat. His last appearance for Leeds, was against Sutton United on 29 January 2017 in the FA Cup in Leeds' shock cup exit.

On 17 May 2017, after failing to break into the Leeds team, it was announced that Grimes would be returning to Swansea upon the expiry of his loan deal. After the spell Grimes described his time at the club, "I took a bit of a knocking going to Leeds, it just didn't happen for me''.

Northampton Town loan spell (2017–18)
On 18 August 2017, it was confirmed that Grimes would be playing football for Northampton Town for the rest of the season. He made 47 appearances in all competitions scoring 4 goals during his season at Northampton, after being unable to help them avoid relegation from EFL League One.

Return to Swansea City
Grimes was recalled to play for Swansea following the club's relegation from the Premier League. He scored his first goal of the season in a 3–2 loss against Manchester City in the FA Cup. Grimes went on to make his 200th appearance across all competitions for Swansea City on the 15th of April 2022 in a 1-1 draw to Barnsley at the Swansea.com Stadium.

International career
On 28 August 2014, Grimes received his first call-up to the England national under-20 team for the friendly match against Romania. In March 2015, Grimes came off the bench to captain the Under 20s in a win against Mexico. He also scored a penalty in the eventual shoot-out following a 1–1 draw. 4 days later, he started as captain at Home Park in 2–1 win over the United States, wearing the number 7 shirt.

Personal life
As a 15-year-old he was part of St Peter's AirBadgers Ultimate Frisbee team that won the Junior National Championships for the third year in a row in 2011. He was voted the most valuable player as AirBadgers beat Brighton in the final 13–1.

Matt has a younger brother - Nick, who is a semi-professional footballer, playing as a defender. Nick Grimes is currently the team-captain for National League South side Taunton Town.

Career statistics

Honours
England U21
Toulon Tournament: 2016

Individual
PFA Team of the Year: 2014–15 League Two
Exeter City Player of the Season: 2013–14

References

External links

Matt Grimes player profile at Northampton Town F.C.
England profile at The FA

1995 births
Living people
Sportspeople from Exeter
Footballers from Devon
English footballers
England youth international footballers
England under-21 international footballers
Association football midfielders
Exeter City F.C. players
Swansea City A.F.C. players
Blackburn Rovers F.C. players
Leeds United F.C. players
Northampton Town F.C. players
English Football League players
Premier League players